The Summer Solstice is a 2007 Chinese film written, produced and directed by 1st time director Li Ruijun. Li delivers an unsentimental and forceful portrait of a 21st-century Chinese family and the pursuit of their dreams in a changing world.

Synopsis
HuYang arrives in Beijing in a hot summer to make his fortune but his company goes broke, and he becomes a monk to beg for alms.

Cast
 Zheng Hui
 Song Jinyang
 Zhang Min

Awards and nominations

Screening history
Completed in 2007, the film has screened at the following festivals:
9th International Panorama of Independent Film and Video Makers (2007), where it received The Special Feature Award
31st São Paulo International Film Festival (Competition - New Directors 2007)
4th China International Film Festival (2007)
2nd Beijing International Film Festival (2007)
1st Berlin Asian hotshots Film Festival (2008)
37th Rotterdam International Film Festival (Sturm und Drang 2008)
2nd cinema digital seoul_film festival (International Competition 2008)
5th Hong Kong Asian Film Festival (2008)
View Finder to Asian Film (2008)

References

External links
 

2007 films
Chinese drama films
2000s Mandarin-language films
Films directed by Li Ruijun